Jambudwip is the name of an isolated island situated in the Bay of Bengal about 8 km to the southwest of Fraserganj/Bakkhali in the South 24 Parganas district of West Bengal, India. It remains uninhabited except in the fishing season, i.e. between the months of October and February.

In the past, fishermen came from the Chittagong and Noakhali areas of Bangladesh for fishing. They developed special aptitude and traditional skills for marine fishing. The main reasons for using Jambudwip were the island's proximity to the fishing grounds, presence of a natural creek for safe harbouring of their boats, and supply of drinking water.

Tourists are not allowed on this island. However, there are small boats available from Frazerganj who takes tourists around this island. It is illegal to stop on this island so these boats take the tourists around the island.

References

Jambudwip - a fishy conservation (India Together)
Entangled (India Environment Portal)

See also

Sundarbans
Ganges Delta

Islands of West Bengal
Geography of South 24 Parganas district
Islands of India
Uninhabited islands of India
Islands of the Bay of Bengal